Live at the Fillmore is a 2010 live album by American rock musician Chris Isaak. The album was recorded in 2008.

Track listing
"Lonely with a Broken Heart" - 3:16
"Somebody's Crying" - 2:52
"Want Your Love" - 3:43
"We Let Her Down" - 3:51
"Graduation Day" - 3:27
"Western Stars" - 3:28
"Speak of the Devil" - 3:25
"Wicked Game" - 4:44
"Best I Ever Had" - 3:57
"Worked It Out Wrong" - 3:43
"Two Hearts" - 4:11
"Take My Heart" - 2:43
"Baby Did a Bad Bad Thing" - 6:12
"San Francisco Days" - 2:53
"Move Along" - 3:36
"Dancin'" - 4:16
"Blue Spanish Sky" - 4:39
"Mr. Lonely Man" [Bonus Track] (Available on iTunes) - 2:49
"Goin' Nowhere" [Bonus Track] (Available on iTunes) - 3:21

Personnel
Chris Isaak - vocals, guitar
Hershel Yatovitz - guitar
Rowland Salley - bass
Scott Plunkett - keyboards
Kenney Dale Johnson - drums
Rafael Padilla - percussion

References

Chris Isaak albums
2010 live albums
Mailboat Records live albums
Albums recorded at the Fillmore